Frederick M. Ahl (born 1941) is a professor of classics and comparative literature at Cornell University. He is known for his work in Greek and Roman epic and drama, and the intellectual history of Greece and Rome, as well as for translations of tragedy and Latin epic.

Studies
Ahl studied classics at Cambridge University, where he received bachelor's and master's degrees, and at the University of Texas, where he received his doctorate.

Career
He taught at the Texas Military Institute, Trinity University, the University of Texas at Austin, and the University of Utah before he joined the Cornell faculty in 1971.

Ahl recorded messages in Ancient Greek, Latin, and Welsh for the Voyager Golden Record that was included with the launch of both Voyager spacecraft in 1977.

He was awarded the Clark Award for Distinguished Teaching by Cornell in 1977 and a fellowship by the National Endowment for the Humanities in 1989-90 and was a Stephen H. Weiss Presidential Fellow in 1996. In 1996–99 and 2000–01 he taught Literature (Attic Tragedy) and Classical Languages as visiting professor at College Year in Athens, a study abroad program in Athens. He has served as director of Cornell Abroad in Greece.

In 2013 Ahl was honored with a conference at Cornell entitled Speaking to Power in Latin and Greek Literature, and in 2016 with a related festschrift, Wordplay and Powerplay in Latin Poetry.

He is active in theater in Ithaca, including Cornell Savoyards' Gilbert and Sullivan productions.

Works
In addition to his several books, Ahl has published articles on topics including ancient Greek music, Homeric narrative,  rhetoric in antiquity, and Latin poetry of the Roman imperial period.

In 1985 Ahl published Metaformations: Soundplay and Wordplay in Ovid and Other Classical Poets. In his 1991 book Sophocles' Oedipus: Evidence and Self-Conviction, he argues that the Oedipus of Sophocles' play is not actually guilty; Oedipus' conclusion that he is guilty is not actually confirmed by the information in the play itself, and the audience's belief in Oedipus' guilt is based on the audience's outside knowledge of the myth. 

In 2007, Ahl published a translation of Virgil's Aeneid into English hexameter, which was republished in paperback in 2008. He is the editor of the series of translations under the rubric "Masters of Latin Literature".

Bibliography

Translations
Phaedra (1986) 
Trojan Women (1986) 
Medea (1986) 
Aeneid (2007), with Elaine Fantham

Scholarship and criticism
Lucan: An Introduction (1976) 
Metaformations: Soundplay and Wordplay in Ovid and Other Classical Poets (1985) 
Sophocles' Oedipus: Evidence and Self Conviction (1991)  (hardcover),  (paperback)
 Seneca: Three Tragedies;
 'Statius' Thebaid: A Reconsideration' in Aufstieg und Niedergang der römischen Welt 2.32.5 (1986) 2803-2912.
The Odyssey Re-Formed, Cornell Studies in Classical Philology (1996), with Hanna Roisman
 Two Faces of Oedipus: Sophocles' Oedipus Tyrannus and Seneca's Oedipus
"The rider and the horse: poetry and politics in Roman poetry from Horace to Statius", in Joseph Vogt, ed.Aufstieg und Niedergang der römischen Welt (Rome: de Gruyter) 1972, pp 40–111.

External links

Official faculty page, at Classics Department of Cornell University
Cornell news release: 1996 Weiss Presidential Fellows, 7 June 1996

References 

Cornell University faculty
Living people
1941 births
American classical scholars
Classical scholars of the University of Texas at Austin
University of Utah faculty
Classical scholars of Cornell University
Scholars of ancient Greek literature
Scholars of Latin literature
Translators of Virgil